Jataria Khurd is a village in Kharian Tehsil of Gujrat District, Punjab, Pakistan. It is situated at about five km westwards from the town of Lalamusa.Khurd and Kalan Persian language word which means small and Big respectively when two villages have same name then it is distinguished as Kalan means Big and Khurd means Small with Village Name.
Jataria Khurd is situated in the Ganja Union Council. Other villages in this Union Council are Gunja, Chak Ikhlas, Chakdina, Hail, Mughli, Dhalla, Chak Rajjadi, Jataria Kalan, Chatta and Sarwani.

References

Populated places in Gujrat District